This is a list of episodes of Television series Mickey's Farm which is a Canadian children's television series show is produced by Best Boy Entertainment in St. John's, Newfoundland and airs on The Pet Network in Canada and in the U.S. on the Trinity Broadcasting Network-owned Smile network, which picked up the U.S. rights to the show in 2012.

Episodes

Season 1 (2009)

Season 2 (2010)

Season 3

Season 4

Season 5

References

Lists of Canadian television series episodes